Quail eggs are eaten and considered a delicacy in many parts of the world, including Asia, Europe, and North America. In Japanese cuisine, they are sometimes used raw or cooked as tamago in sushi and often found in bento lunches. 

In some other countries, eggs of quail are considered less exotic. In Brazil, Colombia, Ecuador and Venezuela, a single hard-boiled quail egg is a common topping on hot dogs and hamburgers, often fixed into place with a toothpick. In the Philippines, kwek-kwek is a popular street food delicacy, which consists of soft-boiled quail eggs dipped in orange-colored batter before being skewered and deep-fried. In Indonesia, small packages of hardboiled quail eggs are sold by street vendors as snacks, and skewered quail eggs are sold as satay to accompany main dishes such as soto and bubur ayam. In Vietnam, bags of boiled quail eggs are sold on street stalls as inexpensive beer snacks. In South Korea, large, inexpensive bags of boiled quail eggs are sold in grocery stores.

See also
 Delicacy
 Egg as food
 Smoked egg

References

Poultry products
Street food
Eggs (food)
Smoked meat